Until I Feel Nothing is the fourth studio album by American deathcore band Carnifex. It was released worldwide on October 24, 2011 through Victory Records. It is the band's last album to feature lead guitarist Ryan Gudmunds.

Background
After the release of the band's 2010 album, Hell Chose Me the band started work on Until I Feel Nothing after their supporting tours for the former. With Hell Chose Mes noticeable advanced shift in style that was ultimately praised by critics, but still having fans of their previous sound, the band decided to create Until I Feel Nothing as a combination of these two sounds.

The album was produced by the band, along with Tim Lambesis, vocalist for As I Lay Dying at his production studio, Lambesis Studios. A music video was produced for the title track and released the same day the album was launched.

Reception

The album received a mostly positive response from critics. In his review for Blabbermouth,  Scott Alisoglu wrote that "these are 10 tracks of smartly composed, relatively distinct, and even memorable tracks of brutal deathcore", noting that this album displayed a particular step forward for the band in terms of songwriting. He noted the songs 'Creation Defaced' and 'Never Forgive Me' "for some compelling arrangements, which often comes down to impacting transitions and various sorts of shading in the guitar work that take equal amounts of death metal's old and new."

Rock Sound's Ryan Bird described the album as "A direct and furious affair", while noting that "A few more layers and the occasional shift in dynamics wouldn't go amiss, but this is an otherwise solid and suitably punishing effort."

Track listing

Appearances 
The title track song has been featured in Rock Band 3 as downloadable content via the Rock Band Network.

Personnel

Carnifex
 Scott Lewis - vocals
 Ryan Gudmunds - lead guitar
 Cory Arford - rhythm guitar
 Fred Calderon - bass
 Shawn Cameron - drums, keyboards

Additional personnel
 Carnifex – producer
 Tim Lambesis – producer
 Daniel Castleman – engineer, tracking
 Fredo Oresto – assistant engineer
 Jason Suecof – mixing at Audio Hammer Studios, Orlando, Florida
 Eyal Levi – mixing
 Alan Douches – mastering at West West Side
 Ashley Jurgemeyer – programming, string arrangement
  Menton3 - Cover art 
  Doublej – layout

Charts

References

2011 albums
Carnifex (band) albums
Victory Records albums